Joseph S. "Joe" Ruggiero (December 7, 1934 – January 20, 2017), who performed as Joey Powers, was an American former pop singer and songwriter whose record "Midnight Mary" reached No. 10 on the Billboard Hot 100 in early January 1964. Powers had no further hits and is known as a "one hit wonder". He later became a booking agent, recording studio owner, record producer, and church leader.

Biography
He was born in Washington, Pennsylvania. He graduated from Washington High School in 1953 and at one time played in a band with Bobby Vinton. He won a wrestling scholarship to Ohio State University before returning to Pennsylvania, where he recorded three singles for the Nu-Clear and ABC labels under the name Joey Rogers in 1958.   However, none were successful.

In 1959 he moved to New York City and, through an introduction by family friend Perry Como, secured a job at NBC.  His singing was heard by songwriter and record producer Paul Vance, who signed him to RCA Records and changed his name to Joey Powers so as to avoid confusion with the singer Jimmy Rodgers.  He released several singles produced by Vance, but again without success, and he returned to Ohio State University to complete his degree and work as a wrestling coach.

However, after ending his contract with Vance in 1963, one of his demo recordings, "Midnight Mary", the lyrics of which were inspired by Jamela, the beautiful daughter of a deposed general, who was exiled to the United States along with the Shah of Iran, was heard by Paul Simon (then recording as Jerry Landis), who recommended it to record label owner Larry Uttal. The song was written by Artie Wayne and Ben Raleigh, originally for the Everly Brothers who turned it down.  Released as a single by Amy Records, Powers' recording rose up the national charts, entering the Hot 100's top 40 at no.36 on Powers' 29th birthday and reaching no.10 at the start of 1964.  Lorna Dune's nearly note-for-note answer record "Midnight Joey" followed soon after.

Powers quickly recorded an album, Midnight Mary — in the week of John F. Kennedy's assassination — with musicians including Paul Simon and Roger McGuinn.

He recorded an album, Special Delivery, with Roy Orbison and country/folk musician Bobby Bare.  However, these were generally ignored, as were subsequent singles, because the public preferred other acts, especially the Beatles and the British Invasion, instead. In 1967, he released a single credited to Joey Powers and The New Dimensions. He then formed a new band, Joey Powers' Flower who performed around Pennsylvania and New Jersey and released several singles on the RCA label in 1969-70, without success.

He later ran a booking agency in Hazlet, New Jersey, and a recording studio in West Orange, New Jersey used by musicians including Jethro Tull, Tony Orlando, Steve Allen, The Kinks and Aerosmith.

He managed the band Phantom's Opera that included Richie Sambora, Tico Torres and Alec John Such, later of Bon Jovi, and helped produce a solo album by drummer Joe English. He won a Gospel Music Association Dove Award for Album of the Year in 1991 for the album Triumphant Return by Christian rock group Whitecross.

He sold the recording studio in the early 1990s and returned to college to study theology, later becoming an ordained minister, and setting up the Bayshore Gospel church in Keyport, New Jersey.  In 2002, he moved to Saint Petersburg, Russia, where he set up a Christian orphanage and built a recording studio.  He later returned to the US.

Death
Ruggiero died January 20, 2017, in Washington, Pennsylvania at age 82. He was survived by his three children and extended family.

References

1934 births
2017 deaths
American male pop singers
Ohio State University alumni
People from Washington, Pennsylvania